Moshe Maya (born 9 August 1938) is an Israeli Haredi rabbi and former politician who served as a member of the Knesset for Shas between 1992 and 1996, and as Deputy Minister of Education and Culture from 1992 until 1993.

Biography
Born in Petah Tikva during the Mandate period, Maya was ordained as a rabbi, and served as the rabbi of Yad Eliyahu neighbourhood of Tel Aviv. He was elected to the Knesset on the Shas list in 1992, and was appointed Deputy Minister of Education and Culture in Yitzhak Rabin's government, holding the post until Shas left the coalition in 1993. He lost his seat in the 1996 elections.

Maya remained a member of Shas, and is currently part of its Shas Council of Torah Sages. He also heads the Zikron Moshe yeshiva in Yad Eliyahu.

References

External links

1938 births
People from Petah Tikva
Orthodox rabbis in Mandatory Palestine
Sephardic Haredi rabbis in Israel
Living people
Shas politicians
Moetzet Chachmei HaTorah
Members of the 13th Knesset (1992–1996)
Deputy ministers of Israel
Rabbinic members of the Knesset